

Utetheisa is a genus of tiger moths in the family Erebidae. The genus was first described by Jacob Hübner in 1819.

Description
Palpi porrect (extending forward), extending beyond the frons. Antennae ciliated. Forewings long and narrow, where the outer margin is short and somewhat erect. Vein 3 from before angle of cell. Veins 4 and 5 from angle, vein 6 from upper angle and vein 7 to 10 from a short areole. Hindwing with vein 5 from above angle of cell. Vein 6 and 7 from upper angle and vein 8 from middle of cell.

Caterpillars of many Utetheisa species feed on Crotalaria (rattlebox), and hence the genus as a whole is often called rattlebox moths. The adults usually have bright aposematic coloration and contain toxic pyrrolizidine alkaloids, which are used as a chemical defense and are also incorporated into the sex pheromones of the males.

Taxonomy
The members of its subgenera Pitasila, Atasca, and Raanya were formerly included in Nyctemera. Utetheisa is placed in the tribe Callimorphina or in the Nyctemerina; some treatments merge the two subtribes.

Utetheisa is monophyletic.

Selected species
Species of Utetheisa include:

Subgenus Utetheisa

 Utetheisa amhara Jordan, 1939
 Utetheisa antennata Swinhoe, 1893
 Utetheisa clareae Robinson, 1971
 Utetheisa connerorum Roque-Albelo & Landry, 2009
 Utetheisa cruentata (Butler, 1881)
 Utetheisa devriesi Hayes, 1975
 Utetheisa diva (Mabille, 1879)
 Utetheisa elata (Fabricius, 1798)
 Utetheisa elata fatela Jordan, 1939
 Utetheisa elata fatua Heyn, 1906
 Utetheisa galapagensis (Wallengren, 1860)
 Utetheisa henrii Roque-Albelo & Landry, 2009
 Utetheisa lactea (Butler, 1884)
 Utetheisa lactea aldabrensis T. B. Fletcher, 1910
 Utetheisa lotrix (Cramer, [1777]) – crotalaria moth
 Utetheisa maddisoni Robinson & Robinson, 1980
 Utetheisa ornatrix (Linnaeus, 1758) – ornate moth, bella moth
 Utetheisa pectinata
 Utetheisa perryi Hayes, 1975
 Utetheisa pulchella (Linnaeus, 1758) – crimson-speckled flunkey
 Utetheisa pulchelloides Hampson, 1907 – heliotrope moth (syn: Utetheisa dorsifumata Prout, 1920)
 Utetheisa salomonis
 Utetheisa semara Moore, 1860
 Utetheisa sumatrana Rothschild, 1910

Subgenus Atasca

 Utetheisa aegrotum (Swinhoe, 1892)
 Utetheisa albilinea De Vos, 2007
 Utetheisa amboina De Vos, 2007
 Utetheisa amosa (Swinhoe, 1903)
 Utetheisa ampatica De Vos, 2007
 Utetheisa aruensis De Vos, 2007
 Utetheisa bouruana (Swinhoe, 1917)
 Utetheisa ceramensis De Vos, 2007
 Utetheisa externa (Swinhoe, 1917)
 Utetheisa frosti (Prout, 1918)
 Utetheisa pellex (Linnaeus, 1758)
 Utetheisa separata (Walker, 1864)
 Utetheisa watubela De Vos, 2007

Subgenus Raanya
 Utetheisa albipuncta (Druce, 1888)
 Utetheisa albipuncta zoilides (Prout, 1920)

Subgenus Pitasila

 Utetheisa assamica De Vos, 2007
 Utetheisa abraxoides (Walker, 1862)
 Utetheisa balinensis De Vos, 2007
 Utetheisa disrupta (Butler, 1887)
 Utetheisa disrupta burica (Holland, 1900)
 Utetheisa distincta (Swinhoe, 1903) (syn: Utetheisa sangira (Swinhoe, 1903))
 Utetheisa inconstans (Butler, 1880) (syn: Utetheisa okinawensis (Inoue, 1982))
 Utetheisa flavothoracica De Vos, 2007
 Utetheisa fractifascia (Wileman, 1911)
 Utetheisa guttulosa (Walker, 1864)
 Utetheisa latifascia (Hopffer, 1874)
 Utetheisa leucospilota (Moore, 1877)
 Utetheisa limbata (Roepke, 1949)
 Utetheisa mendax De Vos, 2007
 Utetheisa nivea De Vos, 2007
 Utetheisa pala (Röber, 1891)
 Utetheisa selecta (Walker, 1854)
 Utetheisa specularis (Walker, 1856) (syn: Utetheisa macklotti (Vollenhoven, 1863))
 Utetheisa specularis extendens De Vos, 2007
 Utetheisa specularis oroya (Swinhoe, 1903)
 Utetheisa timorensis (Roepke, 1954)
 Utetheisa transiens (Jurriaanse & Lindemans, 1919)
 Utetheisa vandenberghi (Nieuwenhuis, 1948)
 Utetheisa varians (Walker, 1854)
 Utetheisa variolosa (Felder & Rogenhofer, [1869] 1874)
 Utetheisa vollenhovii (Snellen, 1890)
 Utetheisa witti De Vos, 2007
 Utetheisa ypsilon De Vos, 2007

References

Further reading
 , 1939: On the constancy and variability of the differences between the Old World species of Utetheisa (Lepid.; Arctiidae). Novitates Zoologicae 41: 251–291, London and Aylesbury.
 , [1967] 1966: Records of the arctiid genus Utetheisa in New Zealand. New Zealand Entomologist 3 (5): 3–4.
 , 1971: The genus Utetheisa Hübner in Fiji with description of a new species (Lepidoptera, Arctiidae). The Entomologist's Record and Journal of Variation 83 (5): 123–130.
 , 1974: Notes on the genus Utetheisa Hübner (Lepidoptera, Arctiidae) in the Western Pacific with larval descriptions. The Entomologist's Record and Journal of Variation 86 (5–6): 160–163.
 , 1979-1980: Further observations on the species of Utetheisa Hübner (Lep.: Arctiidae) in the Western and Central Pacific, with the description of a new species from Niue Island. The Entomologist's Record and Journal of Variation 91 (10): 270–273; 91 (11–12): 319–322, pl. 9; 92 (1): 13-16.
 , 1941: On the Javanese species of the genus Utetheisa Hb. (Lep. Het., fam. Arctiidae). Tijdschrift voor Entomologie 84: 1–9, 4 figs., Amsterdam.

Arctiinae
 
Moth genera
Taxa named by Jacob Hübner